The Roman Catholic Diocese of Leavenworth (Latin Leavenworthen(sis)) is a Latin rite former bishopric and present titular bishopric in and originally around Kansas state, Midwestern United States.

History 
 The future diocese was created on 19 July 1850 as Apostolic Vicariate of Indian Territory East of the Rocky Mountains, by Pope Pius IX.
 On 1857.01.06, it lost territory to establish the then Apostolic Vicariate of Nebraska, and the remainder was renamed as Apostolic Vicariate of Kansas.
 On 22 May 1877, it was promoted as Diocese of Leavenworth, ceasing to be missionary and exempt.
 On 2 August 1887, it lost territories to establish the Dioceses of Wichita and the Concordia.
 On 29 May 1891, it was renamed as Diocese of Kansas City, Kansas / Civitatis Kansas (Latin).
 On 5 March 1897, it was finally renamed as Diocese of Leavenworth.
 On May 10, 1947, the diocese was suppressed and its territory used to establish the then Diocese of Kansas City in Kansas.

Ordinaries 
(all Latin, Roman Rite)

 Apostolic Vicar of Indian Territory East of the Rocky Mountains 
 John Baptiste Miège, Jesuits (S.J.) (born France) (1850.07.23 – 1857 see below), Titular Bishop of Messene (1850.07.23 – death 1884.07.21)

 Apostolic Vicars of Kansas
 John Baptiste Miège, Jesuits (S.J.) (see above 1857 – retired 1874.11.18), died 1884
 Louis Mary Fink, Benedictine Order (O.S.B.) (born Germany) (1874.11.18 – 1877.05.22 see below), Titular Bishop of Eucarpia (1871.03.01 – 1877.05.22), succeeding as former Coadjutor Vicar Apostolic of Kansas (1871.03.01 – 1874.11.18)

 Suffragan Bishop of Leavenworth (first time)
 Louis Mary Fink, (O.S.B.) (see above 1877.05.22 – 1891.05.29 see below)

 Suffragan Bishop of Kansas City, Kansas
 Louis Mary Fink, (O.S.B.) (see above 1891.05.29 – 1897.03.05 see below)

 Suffragan Bishops of Leavenworth (again)
 Louis Mary Fink, (O.S.B.) (see above 1897.03.05 – 1904.03.17 death)
 Thomas Francis Lillis (first native incumbent) (1904.10.24 – 1910.03.14), later Titular Bishop of Cibyra Magna (1910.03.14 – 1913.02.21), Coadjutor Bishop (1910.03.14 – 1913.02.21) and next Bishop of Kansas City (USA) (1913.02.21 – death 1938.12.29)
 John Chamberlain Ward (1910.11.25 – 1929.04.20)
 Francis Johannes (1929.04.20 – 1937.03.13), previously Titular Bishop of Thasus & Coadjutor Bishop of Leavenworth (1927.12.19 – death 1929.04.20)
 Paul Clarence Schulte (1937.05.29 – 1946.07.20); later Metropolitan Archbishop of Indianapolis (1946.07.20 – retired 1970.01.03) and emeritate as Titular Archbishop of Elicroca (1970.01.03 – death 1984.02.17)
 George Joseph Donnelly (1946.11.09 – 1947.05.10), previously Titular Bishop of Cœla & Auxiliary Bishop of Saint Louis (USA) (1940.03.19 – 1946.11.09); later first Bishop of successor diocese Kansas City (1947.05.10 – death 1950.12.13) (now Archdiocese of Kansas City in Kansas)

Titular see 
In 1995, the Diocese was nominally restored as a Latin rite titular bishopric of Leavenworth.

It has had the following incumbents, so far of the fitting Episcopal (lowest) rank:
 Marion Francis Forst (1995.09.23 – death 2007.06.02) as emeritate; previously Bishop of Dodge City (USA) (1960.01.02 – 1976.10.16), Titular Bishop of Scala (1976.10.16 – 1986.12.23) as Auxiliary Bishop of Archdiocese of Kansas City (USA) (1976.10.16 – 1986.12.23)
 Barry Christopher Knestout (2008.11.18 – 2018.01.12) as Auxiliary Bishop of Washington (D.C., USA); next Bishop of Richmond (USA) (2017.12.05 – ...)
 Joel M. Konzen, S.M. (2018.04.03 – ...), Auxiliary Bishop of Atlanta, USA.

See also 
 List of Catholic dioceses in the United States

Notes and references

Sources and external links 
 GCatholic - data for all sections, with incumbent biography links and Google satellite HQ photo

Catholic titular sees in North America
Suppressed Roman Catholic dioceses
History of Kansas
Catholic Church in Kansas
Roman Catholic Archdiocese of Kansas City in Kansas
Roman Catholic dioceses and prelatures established in the 19th century
1877 establishments in Kansas